Fāgogo is a word in the Samoan language to describe a type of storytelling of the Samoa Islands.  It is called "a performing art, almost a type of theatre, where people, events and stories are brought to life through the skills, voice and action of a narrator".  There are several collections of Samoan fāgogo, the most notable being those collected by Augustin Kramer, Brother Herman, and Richard M. Moyle.

Samoan Fāgogo has also influenced the writings of contemporary Samoan writers like Sia Figiel and contemporary Samoan interdisciplinary artist Pati Solomona Tyrell. In 2018 he was the youngest nominee at age twenty-five for the New Zealand Walters Prize award for moving image Fāgogo.

Fāgogo stories often tell of the lives of archetypal figures like Sina in the legend Sina and the Eel, Tinilau, and a legendary Tuimanu'a (as different from the historical Tui Manu'a).  The story of Sina and the Eel (Sina ma le Tuna) is associated with the Mata o le Alelo pool in the village of Matavai, on the north coast of Savai'i, in Samoa.

See also 

 Moʻolelo

References

Samoan folklore
Samoan mythology
Samoan words and phrases